Keno Emlen Davis (born March 10, 1972) an American basketball coach who is the head coach for the Flint United. He was most recently the men's basketball head coach at Central Michigan University. Davis was previously head coach at Drake University for one season (2007–2008), where he was named the 2008 Associated Press College Basketball Coach of the Year, and at Providence College for three seasons (2008-2011). Davis also served as an assistant coach at Drake from 2003–2007 under his father Tom Davis prior to starting his coaching career.

Coaching career
Davis served as an undergraduate assistant coach at the University of Iowa under his father from 1991–1995. After graduating, he served as an assistant coach at the University of Southern Indiana from 1995–1997 and at Southeast Missouri State University from 1997–2003. He rejoined his father as an assistant coach after the elder Davis was named head coach at Drake University in April 2003. When his father retired in 2007, Keno Davis became the team's head coach, and led the Bulldogs to a 28–5 record and a berth in the 2008 NCAA Division I men's basketball tournament. Following the season, Davis was named the College Basketball Coach of the Year by 6 organizations including the Associated Press and U.S. Basketball Writers Association. Davis left Drake University to join the Big East Conference as the head coach of Providence College in April 2008. After the 2010–2011 season Davis joined the Big Ten Network as an analyst for the 2011-2012 college basketball season.

Davis was introduced by Central Michigan University as the Chippewas’ 20th head men's basketball coach on April 3, 2012. Just four players would be on CMU's roster from the previous season (all of which would be reserves for Davis). One of the youngest teams in the country, the Chippewas found a way to win in double figures each season though only acquiring a 21-41 overall record.

Central Michigan finished the 2014-2015 regular season 22-7 (12-6) and earned the top seed in the MAC conference tournament.

Head coaching record

References

External links
 
 Statistics at College Basketball-Reference.com

1972 births
Living people
American men's basketball coaches
Basketball coaches from Pennsylvania
Central Michigan Chippewas men's basketball coaches
College men's basketball head coaches in the United States
Drake Bulldogs men's basketball coaches
Educators from Pennsylvania
Iowa Hawkeyes men's basketball coaches
Providence Friars men's basketball coaches
Southeast Missouri State Redhawks men's basketball coaches
Southern Indiana Screaming Eagles men's basketball coaches
Sportspeople from Easton, Pennsylvania
University of Iowa alumni